Sun Jungang (Chinese: 孙峻岗; born 5 August 1995) is a Chinese football player who currently plays for Dandong Tengyue.

Club career
Sun Jungang joined Genbao Football Academy from Mingyu Football School with Hu Jinghang. He was promoted to Shanghai SIPG's first team squad in the 2014 season. On 3 May 2016, he made his senior debut in the last group match of 2016 AFC Champions League against Suwon Samsung Bluewings in a 3–0 away defeat, coming on as a substitution for Li Haowen in the 77th minute. On 21 March 2017, Sun was loaned to J3 League side Giravanz Kitakyushu for the 2017 season. However, he failed to establish himself within the team. Without playing any match for Giravanz Kitakyushu, his loan deal was ended in advance on 29 October 2017. Sun made his senior league debut on 9 March 2018, in a 2–0 away win over Shanghai Derby rivals Shanghai Greenland Shenhua, coming on for Oscar in the 85th minute.

Career statistics 
Statistics accurate as of match played 31 December 2020.

Honours

Club
Shanghai SIPG
Chinese Super League: 2018

References

External links
 

1995 births
Living people
Chinese footballers
Footballers from Sichuan
Shanghai Port F.C. players
Giravanz Kitakyushu players
Chinese Super League players
Association football midfielders
People from Guangyuan
Chinese expatriate footballers
Expatriate footballers in Japan